Hafnium(IV) oxide is the inorganic compound with the formula . Also known as hafnium dioxide or hafnia, this colourless solid is one of the most common and stable compounds of hafnium. It is an electrical insulator with a band gap of 5.3~5.7 eV. Hafnium dioxide is an intermediate in some processes that give hafnium metal.

Hafnium(IV) oxide is quite inert. It reacts with strong acids such as concentrated sulfuric acid and with strong bases. It dissolves slowly in hydrofluoric acid to give fluorohafnate anions. At elevated temperatures, it reacts with chlorine in the presence of graphite or carbon tetrachloride to give hafnium tetrachloride.

Structure
Hafnia typically adopts the same structure as zirconia (ZrO2). Unlike TiO2, which features six-coordinate Ti in all phases, zirconia and hafnia consist of seven-coordinate metal centres. A variety of other crystalline phases have been experimentally observed, including cubic fluorite (Fmm), tetragonal (P42/nmc), monoclinic (P21/c) and orthorhombic (Pbca and Pnma). It is also known that hafnia may adopt two other orthorhombic metastable phases (space group Pca21 and Pmn21) over a wide range of pressures and temperatures, presumably being the sources of the ferroelectricity observed in thin films of hafnia.

Thin films of hafnium oxides deposited by atomic layer deposition are usually crystalline. Because semiconductor devices benefit from having amorphous films present, researchers have alloyed hafnium oxide with aluminum or silicon (forming hafnium silicates), which have a higher crystallization temperature than hafnium oxide.

Applications
Hafnia is used in optical coatings, and as a high-κ dielectric in DRAM capacitors and in advanced metal–oxide–semiconductor devices. Hafnium-based oxides were introduced by Intel in 2007 as a replacement for silicon oxide as a gate insulator in field-effect transistors. The advantage for transistors is its high dielectric constant: the dielectric constant of HfO2 is 4–6 times higher than that of SiO2. The dielectric constant and other properties depend on the deposition method, composition and microstructure of the material.

Hafnium oxide (as well as doped and oxygen-deficient hafnium oxide) attracts additional interest as a possible candidate for resistive-switching memories and CMOS-compatible ferroelectric field effect transistors (FeFET memory) and memory chips.

Because of its very high melting point, hafnia is also used as a refractory material in the insulation of such devices as thermocouples, where it can operate at temperatures up to 2500 °C.

Multilayered films of hafnium dioxide, silica, and other materials have been developed for use in passive cooling of buildings. The films reflect sunlight and radiate heat at wavelengths that pass through Earth's atmosphere, and can have temperatures several degrees cooler than surrounding materials under the same conditions.

References

Hafnium compounds
High-κ dielectrics
Transition metal oxides
Ferroelectric materials